Eleutherodactylus is a genus of frogs in the family Eleutherodactylidae. Many of the 200 species of the genus are commonly known as "rain frogs" or "robber frogs", due to their sharp, high-pitched, insect-like calls.

The best-known species is the common coquí (E. coqui), which is both a national symbol of Puerto Rico and a notorious invasive species in Hawaii. Two Eleutherodactylus species, E. limbatus and E. iberia, are among the smallest known frogs, measuring only 8.5 mm in length (only slightly larger than Paedophryne amauensis, which measures around 7.7 mm).

Etymology
Most species are small, slender, and cryptically colored, with three to five free toes.  A few, such as the web-footed coquí (E. karlschmidti) of Puerto Rico, do have completely webbed feet.

Distribution and habitat
Species of Eleutherodactylus are found throughout the Neotropics, including the southern United States, Mexico, Central America, and the Caribbean.  Additionally, the common coquí (E. coqui) has been introduced to several islands in the Hawaiian archipelago, as well as elsewhere in the Pacific.

They can be terrestrial, arboreal, or aquatic, typically living in forests or riparian areas, and feeding primarily upon arthropods.  Many Eleutherodactylus species have highly restricted ranges and are found on only one island or in one or a few localities.  Even some of these restricted species can occur at very high densities.

Reproduction and development
All species of Eleutherodactylus are characterized by direct development, in which eggs hatch directly into small frogs, completely bypassing the tadpole stage. This adaptation may be largely responsible for their ecological and evolutionary success. Most species are characterized by parental behaviors, such as egg-guarding by either the male or female parent. In some cases, even young froglets are attended by parents. Another extinct Puerto Rican species, the golden coquí (E. jasperi), gave birth to live young. Many species (for example, Cook's robber frog, E. cooki), also of Puerto Rico, exhibit sexual dimorphism in size and color.

Study on Eleutherodactylus and Lithobates amphibians shows that number of offsprings instead of body size may help to find which species require conservation from being extinct.

Phylogenetics
The basis of forming this genus has been morphological, but sequence comparisons of protein-encoding DNA, mitochondrial DNA, and ribosomal RNA have shown geographic range is a much more consistent predictor of cladistics for this group of frogs. The climbing habits of many species have evolved independently. All true members of the genus have been clustered into subgenera, but many less-related species require more genetic data before they are to be officially classified elsewhere. The theory that the eleutherodactyline colonization of Central America and the Caribbean from their origins in South America occurred during the Cretaceous has fallen out of favor. The fossil record, combined with molecular clock analyses, indicate the subgenera were probably founded by small groups of individuals by flotsam dispersal during the Eocene or Oligocene epochs. Land bridges would have been limited to facilitating dispersal between West Indian islands, however, the Oligocene division of Hispaniola and Cuba resulted in further speciation. The distribution of the subgenus Syrrhopus is most likely due to a secondary dispersal to Central America from the Greater Antilles during the Miocene. The formation of the Panama Isthmus during the Pliocene has caused some intercontinental distribution among the clades, although only 20 "South American frogs" have ever made it northwards after the original colonization. Sensu stricto, however, it should exclude clades with distributions south of the Panama Canal.

Fossil record 
Frog remains referred to Eleutherodactylus have been reported from Dominican amber.

Species
The following species are recognised in the genus Eleutherodactylus:
 Eleutherodactylus aporostegus Schwartz, 1965
 Eleutherodactylus bothroboans Schwartz, 1965
 Eleutherodactylus campi (Stejneger, 1915)
 Eleutherodactylus counouspeus Schwartz, 1964
 Eleutherodactylus diplasius Schwartz, 1973
 Eleutherodactylus erythroproctus Schwartz, 1960
 Eleutherodactylus feichtingeri Díaz, Hedges, and Schmid, 2012
 Eleutherodactylus limbensis Lynn, 1958
 Eleutherodactylus melatrigonum Schwartz, 1966
 Eleutherodactylus notidodes Schwartz, 1966
 Eleutherodactylus olibrus Schwartz, 1958
 Eleutherodactylus orarius (Dixon, 1957)
 Eleutherodactylus paralius Schwartz, 1976
 Eleutherodactylus rucillensis Cochran, 1939
 Eleutherodactylus sommeri Schwartz, 1977
 Eleutherodactylus staurometopon Schwartz, 1960
 Eleutherodactylus tychathrous Schwartz, 1965

West Indian (subgenus Eleutherodactylus)

 E. (E.) abbotti Cochran, 1923
 E. (E.) amplinympha Kaiser, Green & Schmid, 1994
 E. (E.) antillensis Reinhardt & Lütken, 1863
 E. (E.) audanti Cochran, 1934
 E. (E.) auriculatoides Noble, 1923
 E. (E.) auriculatus Cope, 1862
 E. (E.) barlagnei Lynch, 1965
 E. (E.) bartonsmithi Schwartz, 1960
 E. (E.) brittoni Schmidt, 1920
 E. (E.) cochranae Grant, 1932
 E. (E.) cooki Grant, 1932
 E. (E.) coqui Thomas, 1966
 E. (E.) eileenae Dunn, 1926
 E. (E.) eneidae Rivero, 1959
 E. (E.) flavescens Noble, 1923
 E. (E.) fowleri Schwartz, 1973
 E. (E.) glamyrus Estrada & Hedges, 1997
 E. (E.) gryllus Schmidt, 1920
 E. (E.) guantanamera Hedges, Estrada & Thomas, 1992
 E. (E.) haitianus Barbour, 1942
 E. (E.) hedricki Rivero, 1963
 E. (E.) ionthus Schwartz, 1960
 E. (E.) jasperi Drewry & Jones, 1976
 E. (E.) johnstonei Barbour, 1914
 E. (E.) juanariveroi Ríos-López & Thomas, 2007
 E. (E.) karlschmidti Grant, 1931
 E. (E.) lamprotes Schwartz, 1973
 E. (E.) leberi Schwartz, 1965
 E. (E.) locustus Schmidt, 1920
 E. (E.) mariposa Hedges, Estrada & Thomas, 1992
 E. (E.) martinicensis Tschudi, 1838
 E. (E.) melacara Hedges, Estrada & Thomas, 1992
 E. (E.) minutus Noble, 1923
 E. (E.) montanus Schmidt, 1919
 E. (E.) parabates Schwartz, 1964
 E. (E.) patriciae Schwartz, 1965
 E. (E.) pinchoni Schwartz, 1967
 E. (E.) pituinus Schwartz, 1965
 E. (E.) poolei Cochran, 1938
 E. (E.) portoricensis Schmidt, 1927
 E. (E.) principalis Estrada & Hedges, 1997
 E. (E.) richmondi Stejneger, 1904
 E. (E.) ronaldi Schwartz, 1960
 E. (E.) schwartzi Thomas, 1966
 E. (E.) unicolor Stejneger, 1904
 E. (E.) varians Gundlach & Peters, 1864
 E. (E.) wetmorei Cochran, 1932
 E. (E.) wightmanae Schmidt, 1920

West Indian (subgenus Euhyas)

 E. (Eu.) acmonis Schwartz, 1960
 E. (Eu.) adelus Diaz, Cadiz & Hedges, 2003
 E. (Eu.) albipes Barbour & Shreve, 1937
 E. (Eu.) alcoae Schwartz, 1971
 E. (Eu.) alticola Lynn, 1937
 E. (Eu.) amadeus Hedges, Thomas & Franz, 1987
 E. (Eu.) andrewsi Lynn, 1937
 E. (Eu.) apostates Schwartz, 1973
 E. (Eu.) armstrongi Noble & Hassler, 1933
 E. (Eu.) atknisi Dunn, 1925
 E. (Eu.) bakeri Cochran, 1935
 E. (Eu.) beguei Díaz and Hedges, 2015
 E. (Eu.) blairhedgesi Estrada, Díaz & Rodriguez, 1998
 E. (Eu.) bresslerae Schwartz, 1960
 E. (Eu.) brevirostris Shreve, 1936
 E. (Eu.) caribe Hedges & Thomas, 1992
 E. (Eu.) casparii Dunn, 1926
 E. (Eu.) cavernicola Lynn, 1954
 E. (Eu.) corona Hedges & Thomas, 1992
 E. (Eu.) cubanus Barbour, 1942
 E. (Eu.) cundalli Dunn, 1926
 E. (Eu.) cuneatus Cope, 1862
 E. (Eu.) darlingtoni Cochran, 1935
 E. (Eu.) dimidiatus Cope, 1862
 E. (Eu.) dolomedes Hedges & Thomas, 1992
 E. (Eu.) emiliae Dunn, 1926
 E. (Eu.) etheridgei Schwartz, 1958
 E. (Eu.) eunaster Schwartz, 1973
 E. (Eu.) furcyensis Shreve & Williams, 1963
 E. (Eu.) fuscus Lynn & Dent, 1943
 E. (Eu.) glandulifer Cochran, 1935
 E. (Eu.) glanduliferoides Shreve, 1936
 E. (Eu.) glaphycompus Schwartz, 1973
 E. (Eu.) glaucoreius Schwartz & Fowler, 1973
 E. (Eu.) goini Schwartz, 1960
 E. (Eu.) gossei Dunn, 1926
 E. (Eu.) grabhami Dunn, 1926
 E. (Eu.) grahami Schwartz, 1979
 E. (Eu.) greyi Dunn, 1926
 E. (Eu.) griphus Crombie, 1986
 E. (Eu.) guanahacabibes Estrada & Rodriguez, 1985
 E. (Eu.) gundlachi Schmidt, 1920
 E. (Eu.) heminota Shreve & Williams, 1963
 E. (Eu.) iberia Estrada & Hedges, 1996
 E. (Eu.) intermedius Barbour & Shreve, 1937
 E. (Eu.) jamaicensis Barbour, 1910
 E. (Eu.) jaumei Estrada & Alonso, 1997
 E. (Eu.) jugans Cochran, 1937
 E. (Eu.) junori Dunn, 1926
 E. (Eu.) klinikowskii Schwartz, 1959
 E. (Eu.) lentus Cope, 1862
 E. (Eu.) leoncei Shreve & Williams, 1963
 E. (Eu.) limbatus Cope, 1862
 E. (Eu.) lucioi Schwartz, 1980
 E. (Eu.) luteolus Gosse, 1851
 E. (Eu.) maestrensis Díaz, Cádiz & Navarro, 2005
 E. (Eu.) michaelschmidi Díaz, Cádiz & Navarro, 2007
 E. (Eu.) monensis Meerwarth, 1901
 E. (Eu.) nubicola Dunn, 1926
 E. (Eu.) orcutti Dunn, 1928
 E. (Eu.) orientalis Barbour & Shreve, 1937
 E. (Eu.) oxyrhyncus Duméril & Bibron, 1841
 E. (Eu.) pantoni Dunn, 1926
 E. (Eu.) paulsoni Schwartz, 1964
 E. (Eu.) pentasyringos Schwartz & Fowler, 1973
 E. (Eu.) pezopetrus Schwartz, 1960
 E. (Eu.) pictissimus Cochran, 1935
 E. (Eu.) pinarensis Dunn, 1926
 E. (Eu.) planirostris Cope, 1862
 E. (Eu.) probolaeus Schwartz, 1965
 E. (Eu.) rhodesi Schwartz, 1980
 E. (Eu.) ricordii Duméril & Bibron, 1841
 E. (Eu.) riparius Estrada & Hedges, 1998
 E. (Eu.) rivularis Diaz, Estrada & Hedges, 2001
 E. (Eu.) rogersi Goin, 1955
 E. (Eu.) rufifemroralis Noble & Hassler, 1933
 E. (Eu.) schmidti Noble, 1923
 E. (Eu.) sciagraphus Schwartz, 1973
 E. (Eu.) semipalmatus Shreve, 1936
 E. (Eu.) simulans Diaz & Fong, 2001
 E. (Eu.) sisyphodemus Crombie, 1977
 E. (Eu.) tetajulia Estrada & Hedges, 1996
 E. (Eu.) thomasi Schwartz, 1959
 E. (Eu.) thorectes Hedges, 1988
 E. (Eu.) toa Estrada & Hedges, 1991
 E. (Eu.) tonyi Estrada & Hedges, 1997
 E. (Eu.) turquinensis Barbour & Shreve, 1937
 E. (Eu.) varleyi Dunn, 1925
 E. (Eu.) ventrilineatus Shreve, 1936
 E. (Eu.) warreni Schwartz, 1976
 E. (Eu.) weinlandi Barbour, 1914
 E. (Eu.) zugi Schwartz, 1958

Hispaniolan (subgenus Pelorius)

 E. (P.) cattus Rodriguez, Dugo-Cota, Montero-Mendieta, Gonzalez-Voyer, Alonso Bosch, Vences, and Vilà, 2017
 E. (P.) chlorophenax Schwartz, 1976
 E. (P.) geitonos Díaz, Incháustegui, Marte, Köhler, Cádiz, and Rodríguez, 2018
 E. (P.) hypostenor Schwartz, 1965
 E. (P.) inoptatus Barbour, 1914
 E. (P.) ligiae Incháustegui, Díaz, and Marte, 2015
 E. (P.) neiba Incháustegui, Díaz, and Marte, 2015
 E. (P.) nortoni Schwartz, 1976
 E. (P.) parapelates Hedges & Thomas, 1987
 E. (P.) ruthae Noble, 1923

North/Central American and Cuban (subgenus Syrrhopus)

 E. (S.) albolabris Lynch & Lescure, 1980
 E. (S.) angustidigitorum Taylor, 1940
 Eleutherodactylus colimotl Grünwald, Reyes-Velasco, Franz-Chávez, Morales-Flores, Ahumada-Carrillo, Jones, and Boissinot, 2018
 E. (S.) cystingnathoides Cope, 1877
 E. (S.) dennisi Lynch, 1970
 E. (S.) dilatus Davis & Dixon, 1955
 E. (S.) erendirae Grünwald, Reyes-Velasco, Franz-Chávez, Morales-Flores, Ahumada-Carrillo, Jones, and Boissinot, 2018
 E. (S.) floresvillelai Grünwald, Reyes-Velasco, Franz-Chávez, Morales-Flores, Ahumada-Carrillo, Jones, and Boissinot, 2018
 E. (S.) grandis Dixon, 1957
 E. (S.) grunwaldi Reyes-Velasco, Ahumada-Carrillo, Burkhardt, and Devitt, 2015
 E. (S.) guttilatus Cope, 1879
 E. (S.) interorbitalis Langebartel & Shannon, 1956
 E. (S.) jaliscoensis Grünwald, Reyes-Velasco, Franz-Chávez, Morales-Flores, Ahumada-Carrillo, Jones, and Boissinot, 2018
 E. (S.) leprus Cope, 1879
 E. (S.) longipes Baird, 1859
 E. (S.) manantlanensis Grünwald, Reyes-Velasco, Franz-Chávez, Morales-Flores, Ahumada-Carrillo, Jones, and Boissinot, 2018
 E. (S.) marnockii Cope, 1878
 E. (S.) maurus Hedges, 1989
 E. (S.) modestus Taylor, 1942
 E. (S.) nietoi Grünwald, Reyes-Velasco, Franz-Chávez, Morales-Flores, Ahumada-Carrillo, Jones, and Boissinot, 2018
 E. (S.) nitidus Peters, 1870
 E. (S.) pallidus Duellman, 1958
 E. (S.) pipilans Taylor, 1940
 E. (S.) rubrimaculatus Taylor & Smith, 1945
 E. (S.) rufescens (Duellman & Dixon, 1959)
 E. (S.) saxatilis Webb, 1962
 E. (S.) symingtoni Schwartz, 1957
 E. (S.) syristes Hoyt, 1965
 E. (S.) teretistes Duellman, 1958
 E. (S.) verrucipes Cope, 1885
 E. (S.) verruculatus Peters, 1870
 E. (S.) wixarika Reyes-Velasco, Ahumada-Carrillo, Burkhardt, and Devitt, 2015
 E. (S.) zeus Schwartz, 1958

References

 
Eleutherodactylinae
Amphibian genera
Taxa named by André Marie Constant Duméril
Taxa named by Gabriel Bibron